Seduce Me is a 2013 Slovenian drama film written and directed by Marko Šantić. It was selected as the Slovenian entry for the Best Foreign Language Film at the 87th Academy Awards, but was not nominated.

Cast
 Janko Mandic as Luka
 Nina Rakovec as Ajda
 Natasa Barbara Gracner as Luka's mother
 Peter Musevski as Supervisor
 Dario Varga as Milan
 Primoz Pirnat as Blaz
 Grega Zorc as Stane
 Ljerka Belak as Milena
 Igor Zuzek as Uncle Franci
 Igor Samobor as Luka's father
 Maja Gal Stromar as Irma

See also
 List of submissions to the 87th Academy Awards for Best Foreign Language Film
 List of Slovenian submissions for the Academy Award for Best Foreign Language Film

References

External links
 

2013 films
2013 drama films
Slovene-language films
Slovenian drama films